Löbejün is a former town in the Saalekreis in Saxony-Anhalt, Germany. Since 1 January 2011, it is part of the town Wettin-Löbejün.

Geography

Geographic location
The town is located in a hilly area in which a tributary to the Saale River, the Fuhne, flows.

Geology
The town is known for its Löbejüner porphyry. In the northeastern part of the town coal beds are found.

City classification
The following towns are classified as part of Löbejün:
Gottgau
Schlettau

History
Löbejün was first recognized in 961 as Liubichun.

Population development

² Source: Statistisches Landesamt Sachsen-Anhalt

Industrial development
Since 1518 (when the quarry was first mentioned) porphyry was processed. In circa 1622 the coal mine was founded.  The coal mine reached peak production in  the 18th century, when it had 27 mine shafts. It closed in 1884.

Politics
Löbejün was part of the Verwaltungsgemeinschaft Saalkreis Nord until 2011.

Mayor
The last mayor of Löbejün was Thomas Madl (CDU), who was in office from 1990 until 1994, and from 1995 until the formation of Wettin-Löbejün in 2011.

City emblem
The city shield consists of a green background with two silver key with their teeth pointed outwards.  Four roses (the upper and lower, silver, and the ones on the side, red) are also found on the shield.

Partner cities
Schifferstadt (since 2002)

Culture and monuments

Museums
Heimatmuseum im Halleschen Tor

Music
The Internationale Carl-Loewe-Gesellschaft e. V. (International Carl Loewe Society) holds concerts and events related to the composer Carl Loewe.

Economy and infrastructure

Long-time companies present in Löbejün
In Löbejün porphyry is removed from the ground. Often used as fill in building roads, it is also used in home construction and also in the city wall, the Hallesche Tor and other buildings in the city.

Famous people
The composer Carl Loewe was born on 30 November 1796 in Löbejün. The birthplace of Loewe was torn down in 1886. In the place of the house, near the Church of St. Petri, the Alte Schule (the old school) (today: Carl Loewe-Haus) was built.

Literature
: Wanderungen durch den Saalkreis (Journeys through the region surrounding Halle), Halle 1921

References

Towns in Saxony-Anhalt
Former municipalities in Saxony-Anhalt
Wettin-Löbejün